Wood Street Galleries, a visual arts project of the Pittsburgh Cultural Trust, is a gallery located in Downtown Pittsburgh, Pennsylvania. The gallery occupies the upper floors of the Max Azen company building, above the Wood Street light rail stop.

History
The triangular-shaped building that houses the gallery was transferred to the Pittsburgh Cultural Trust in 1990 by the Pittsburgh Port Authority Transit, for the sum of $1 per year. The Wood Street Galleries were established two years later in 1992.

The gallery has a focus on contemporary and technological art.

References

External links
Official site

Tourist attractions in Pittsburgh
Art galleries established in 1993
Art museums and galleries in Pennsylvania
1993 establishments in Pennsylvania
Museums in Pittsburgh